Dialkylbiaryl phosphine ligands are phosphine ligands that are used in homogeneous catalysis. They have proved useful in Buchwald-Hartwig amination and etherification reactions as well as Negishi cross-coupling, Suzuki-Miyaura cross-coupling, and related reactions. In addition to these Pd-based processes, their use has also been extended to transformations catalyzed by nickel, gold, silver, copper, rhodium, and ruthenium, among other transition metals.

General features

Dialkylbiaryl phosphine ligands  are air-stable solids. Many are available commercially.  They often can be synthesized in from inexpensive starting materials. One pot protocols have been conducted on >10 kg scales.

Their enhanced catalytic activity over other ligands in palladium-catalyzed coupling reactions have been attributed to their electron-richness, steric bulk, and some special structural features. In particular, cyclohexyl, t-butyl, and adamantyl groups on the phosphorus are used for this purpose as bulky, electron-donating substituents. The lower ring of the biphenyl system, ortho to the phosphino group, is also a key structural feature. Numerous crystallographic studies have indicated that it behaves as a hemilabile ligand and is believed to play a role in stabilizing the highly reactive, formally 12-electron LPd(0) intermediate during the catalytic cycle. 2,6-Substitution on the lower ring minimizes catalyst decomposition via Pd-mediated C-H activation of these positions. Extensive experimentation by the Buchwald group has shown that further minor changes to the structure of these ligands can dramatically alter their catalytic activity in cross coupling reactions with different substrates. This has led to the evolution of multiple ligands that are tailored for specific transformations. By providing a means of generating the postulated catalytically active LPd(0) species under mild conditions (room temperature or lower in many cases), the development of several generations of base-activated, cyclopalladated precatalysts have further broadened the applicability of the ligands and simplified their use.

DavePhos

DavePhos, the first reported dialkylbiaryl phosphine ligand, was initially used in Pd-catalyzed Suzuki-Miyaura cross-coupling reactions as well as Buchwald-Hartwig aminations. Complexes of this ligand also catalyze a wide array of reactions, including the arylation of ketones and esters, borylation of aryl chlorides, and the arylation of indoles.

Many modified versions of DavePhos have been synthesized. tBuDavePhos has been shown to be an even more reactive variant of DavePhos in the room temperature Suzuki-Miyaura coupling of aryl bromides and chlorides. The biphenyl equivalent (PhDavePhos) is also available.

JohnPhos 

JohnPhos supports the Pd catalyzed Suzuki-Miyaura reactions with aryl bromides and chlorides. It tolerates hindered substrates and operates at room temperature with low catalyst loading. This ligand has been utilized in multiple reactions including the amination of a range of aryl halides and triflates as well as the arylation of thiophenes.

MePhos 

Like DavePhos and JohnPhos, MePhos is competent in the Pd-catalyzed Suzuki-Miyaura coupling. It can also form the active catalyst in the formation of aryl ketones. Variants of this ligand, including tBuMePhos, are also commercially available.

The Pd2(dba)3/MePhos catalytic system has been applied to late stage Suzuki cross couplings. This reaction has been conducted on a kilogram scale, and no specific palladium-removal treatment was required as the excess imidazole present in the final amide coupling step coordinated to the Pd and generated a removable byproduct.

XPhos 

XPhos supports Pd-based catalysts for amination and amidation of arylsulfonates and aryl halides. XPhos has also been used in the Pd catalyzed borylation of aryl and heteroaryl chlorides

Modified versions of XPhos, he more hindered tBuXPhos and Me4tButylXPhos, have been employed in the formation of diaryl ethers. Incorporation of a sulfonate group at the 4-position allows this ligand to be used for Sonogashira couplings in aqueous biphasic solvents.

SPhos

SPhos has proven effective in Pd-catalyzed Suzuki-Miyaura coupling reactions. This ligand enables the cross-coupling of heteroaryl, electron-rich and electron-poor aryl, and vinylboronic acids with a variety of aryl and heteroaryl halides under mild reaction conditions.  SPhos has also been used in the Pd-catalyzed borylation of aryl and heteroaryl chlorides.
3-Sulfonate variants of sSPhos have been used in Suzuki-Miyaura couplings in aqueous media. SPhos was used in the 8 step total synthesis of (±)-geigerin.

RuPhos 

RuPhos has proven effective for Pd-catalyzed Negishi coupling of organozincs with aryl halides. This ligands tolerates hindered substrates as well as a wide range of functional groups. Its complexes also catalyze the trifluoromethylation of aryl chlorides and aminations of aryl halides.

BrettPhos

BrettPhos has been evaluated for the Pd-catalyzed amination of aryl mesylates and aryl halides. Pd-BrettPhos  complexes catalyze the coupling of weak nucleophiles with aryl halides. Such catalysts are selective for the monoarylation of primary amines.  Other applications of BrettPhos in catalysis include trifluoromethylation of aryl chlorides, the formation of aryl trifluoromethyl sulfides, and Suzuki-Miyaura cross-couplings.

Pd- tBuBrettPhos complexes catalyze the conversion of aryl triflates and aryl bromides to aryl fluorides as well as the synthesis of aromatic nitro compounds. The bulky AdBrettPhos can be used in the amidation of five-membered heterocyclic halides that contain multiple heteroatoms (such as haloimidazoles and halopyrazoles).

CPhos

CPhos has been utilized in the Pd-catalyzed Negishi coupling of secondary alkylzinc reagents with aryl halides.

AlPhos

AlPhos allows for the mild Pd-catalyzed fluorination of aryl- and heteroaryl triflates. Reported in 2015, this ligand

See also
 Coupling reaction
 Organometallic chemistry
 Ligand

References

Phosphines
Catalysis
Ligands